Carcuma may refer to:

Carcuma, South Australia, a locality
Carcuma Conservation Park, a protected area in South Australia
Hundred of Carcuma, a cadastral unit in South Australia